Galina Filatova (born 18 December 1949) is a Soviet athlete. She competed in the women's high jump at the 1976 Summer Olympics.

References

1949 births
Living people
Athletes (track and field) at the 1976 Summer Olympics
Soviet female high jumpers
Olympic athletes of the Soviet Union
Place of birth missing (living people)
Universiade medalists in athletics (track and field)
Universiade gold medalists for the Soviet Union
Medalists at the 1973 Summer Universiade
Medalists at the 1975 Summer Universiade